Telefe Bahía Blanca (call sign LU 80 TV) is an Argentine private, over-the-air television station broadcasting on channel 9 from Bahía Blanca, Buenos Aires. The station is an owned and operated station of the Telefe network. Founded on September 24, 1965, the station produces the least amount of local programming in the Telefe group, not showing local shows at all during Sundays.

Local programming
Audiomotor
Telefe Noticias - newscast
De Shopping - variety
A las Chapas - motoring
Por Bahía - public affairs
Rebelion en la Chacra
Codigo femenino
Inversiones del Sur
Bahia directo
Olimpo es de Primera - sports program

See also
Channel 7 (Bahía Blanca, Argentina), Channel 9's only competitor.

Television stations in Argentina
Television channels and stations established in 1962
Telefe